The Sociedad de Gestión de Productores Fonográficos del Paraguay (SGP) (English: Society of Management of Phonographic Producers of Paraguay) is a Paraguayan non-profit organization that represents phonographic producers and performers throughout the country. SGP provides monthly top 100 and 50 music charts for Paraguay.

The SGP is an associated member of the International Federation of the Phonographic Industry and also serves as the national ISRC agency.

Charts 
The SGP publishes four lists of the most played songs and artists on selected radio stations, for information purposes for the general public visiting their website.
The website provides the following charts;
 Top 100 Canciones generales
 Top 100 Artistas generales
 Top 50 de Música Nacional
 Top 50 de Artistas Nacionales

Music recording certification
SGP is the organization awarding music recording certifications in Paraguay. Originally, only albums were certified, with certification levels of 5,000 for Gold album and 10,000 for Platinum for both domestic and international artist. Those numbers have lasted at least until June 2013.

See also
Monitor Latino

References

External links 
 Official site (in Spanish)

2002 establishments in Paraguay
Music industry associations
Music organisations based in Paraguay
Organizations established in 2002
Record charts